Milanese bobbin lace is a textile used as a fashion accessory or a decorative trim, first becoming popular in the 17th and 18th centuries in Milan. Lacemaking was an important economic activity in Northern Italy, besides touching on social status matters as well as being a culturally significant art form. Typical characteristics of Milanese bobbin lace are scrolls made with curving clothwork tapes and floral motifs, and sometimes also consisting of human or animal figures. Sometimes needle lace techniques were combined with the bobbin lace pieces to create the final product.

The lace was made in parts, and joined by bridges or filled in with mesh grounds between existing pattern motifs. Novel ornamentational features such as small beads affixed for eyes are sometimes found, as well as folded tallies and wheatears that add dimension to figures or edges.

Use of the lace in Ecclesiastical settings such as altar cloths and vestments likely represented Church support of the regional lacemaking. Examples of chalice cloths display the lace as edging, for example. Additionally, larger flounces might relay Biblical tales such as the example of the Old Testament story of Joseph, with many human, animal, and even astronomical motifs. Fashion uses, such as collars and cuffs, have also been documented.

Commissions of lace by wealthy patrons for weddings or other notable occasions might include family coat-of-arms displayed in the lace.

Lacemaking has continued through the centuries, adapting to later fashion styles and other influences. The original styles are said to have influenced the tape laces of eastern European styles such as Russian, Hungarian, and Slovak laces. Milanese lace continues to be made today with nods to historical tapes and other motifs but with new artistic formats such as the work of Louise Colgan and colorways reminiscent of watercolors by Sandi Woods. Instructional pattern books make the recreation of the traditional laces possible for lacemakers today, as well as expanding the range into contemporary styles.

Gallery

References 

Lace
Bobbin lace
Milan
Textiles